Aase Moløkken (born 27 April 1930 in Norderhov, Buskerud) is a Norwegian politician (Ap). She was elected to the Stortinget from Buskerud in 1981. She was deputy representative 1973 – 1977,  1977 – 1981 and 1981 – 1985.

Storting committees
1985 – 1989 part of Communal and environmental committee
1981 – 1985 part of Communal and environmental committee
1977 – 1981 part of Administration committee

References

Members of the Storting
People from Ringerike (municipality)
1930 births
Living people
Labour Party (Norway) politicians
20th-century Norwegian politicians